Elections for the Indian state of Goa took place 2002.

Results

Results by constituency
The following is the list of winning MLAs in the election.

By Elections

Government formation 

On 3 June 2002, Bharatiya Janata Party formed its first government in Goa under the leadership of Manohar Parrikar which lasted for 2 years and 244 days. government fall due to Digambar Kamat fallout Bharatiya Janata Party

References

State Assembly elections in Goa
2000s in Goa
Goa